Tela Airport  is an airport serving Tela, a town in the Atlántida Department on the northern coast of Honduras.

Construction began in 2014 and was estimated to cost US$13 million.

After completion, the new runway and terminal were inaugurated by Honduras President Juan Orlando Hernández on May 20, 2015.

There are hills southeast of the runway. Northeast approach and departure are over the water.

See also

List of airports in Honduras
Transport in Honduras

References

External links

OurAirports - Tela Airport
OpenStreetMap - Tela

Airports in Honduras
Atlántida Department